Professor Arvind M. Shah retired from his professorship in the Department of Sociology at the University of Delhi in 1996. He had been a student of M. N. Srinivas in 1952 and became a teacher in sociology at Maharaja Sayajirao University, Baroda, in 1958. He moved to the University of Delhi in 1961.

According to Hetukar Jha, Shah wrote the first paper on the sociological history of India. He was a recipient of the Lifetime Achievement award from the Indian Sociological Society (ISS) in 2009. He had held the office of ISS President in 1992-93 and had been secretary, sometimes jointly, from 1967 to 1972.

Publications
Among Shah's publications, his The Household Dimension of the Family in India (1973) is regarded as a landmark study and in 2014 was re-issued in a single volume titled  The Writings of A. M. Shah: The Household and Family in India, which included some of his later writings on the subject - The Family in India: Critical Essays (1998) and Essays on the Family and the Elderly.

Awards and honours
A festschrift in Shah's honour was published in 2010, entitled Understanding Indian Society: Past and Present (Essays for A M Shah).

References 

Academic staff of Delhi University
Academic staff of Maharaja Sayajirao University of Baroda
Indian sociologists
Date of birth missing (living people)
Living people
Year of birth missing (living people)